Don't Tell may refer to: 
 Don't Tell: The Sexual Abuse of Boys, a 1997 French non-fiction book
 Don't Tell (2005 film), an Italian film, also known as The Beast in the Heart
 Don't Tell (2017 film), an Australian drama film